Ernest Leighton "Ernle" Haisley (born 20 June 1937) is a Jamaican former high jumper who competed in the 1956 Summer Olympics.

In 1956 Haisley took part in the 1956 Summer Olympics in Melbourne. He reached a height of 1.96 metres in the  final, placing him 15th.

Haisley represented Jamaica at the 1958 British Empire and Commonwealth Games winning gold in the high jump with a height of  6 ft 9 in (2.06 m). This remained the Commonwealth Games high jump record until 1962. 
In the following year, he represented British West Indies at the 1959 Pan American Games, winning bronze with a height of 2.00 metres. 
His final success in major competition was at the Athletics at the 1962 Central American and Caribbean Games in Kingston, Jamaica, where he won bronze with a height of 1.94 metres.

References

1937 births
Living people
People from Saint Catherine Parish
Jamaican male high jumpers
Olympic athletes of Jamaica
Athletes (track and field) at the 1956 Summer Olympics
Athletes (track and field) at the 1958 British Empire and Commonwealth Games
Commonwealth Games gold medallists for Jamaica
Commonwealth Games medallists in athletics
Athletes (track and field) at the 1959 Pan American Games
Pan American Games bronze medalists for the British West Indies
Pan American Games medalists in athletics (track and field)
Medalists at the 1959 Pan American Games
Central American and Caribbean Games medalists in athletics
Central American and Caribbean Games bronze medalists for Jamaica
Competitors at the 1962 Central American and Caribbean Games
20th-century Jamaican people
21st-century Jamaican people
Medallists at the 1958 British Empire and Commonwealth Games